Karaikella is a village situated at Chaibasa Ranchi Main Road (NH-75) near Chakradharpur in the Indian state of Jharkhand. It has a basic school, a high school, a hospital and a police station.

External links
 http://www.karaikella.blogspot.com Karaikella Blogspot
 http://www.karaikella.wordpress.com Karaikella Wordpress
 https://web.archive.org/web/20130703120118/http://karaikella.in/ Karaikella Website

Villages in West Singhbhum district